Andrew Unger (born November 8, 1979) is a Canadian novelist and satirist from Steinbach, Manitoba. He is the author of the Mennonite satire website The Daily Bonnet, now known as The Unger Review, and the satirical novel Once Removed.

Career 

Before starting the Daily Bonnet, Unger was a contributor to numerous non-fiction publications including Geez, CBC.ca, and Ballast, sometimes publishing under the pen name Andrew J. Bergman. Early in his career, he also wrote and published fiction and poetry, as well as working as a ghostwriter for New York-based Kevin Anderson & Associates. 

In 2016 Unger founded the Daily Bonnet and, along with his wife Erin Koop Unger, the non-satirical website Mennotoba in 2017. Since 2016, Unger has written more than two thousand Daily Bonnet articles. The website has been visited millions of times each year and has been cited in debate in the Manitoba Legislature and used as an example of Mennonite humour in the Canadian House of Commons. 

In 2020 Unger's novel Once Removed was released by Turnstone Press. The novel, which tells the story of a struggling writer trying to preserve his town's fading history, won the 2021 Eileen McTavish Sykes Award for Best First Book and was a finalist for the 2020 Margaret McWilliams Award.

In late 2021, Unger released a collection of Daily Bonnet articles called The Best of the Bonnet, also published by Turnstone Press. 

In 2023, Unger changed the name of The Daily Bonnet to The Unger Review, while maintaining The Daily Bonnet as a section of the website.

Writing style 

Unger cites Jonathan Swift, Sinclair Lewis, Armin Wiebe, Billy Wilder, and Miriam Toews among his writing influences. His work has been described as Horatian satire by scholar Nathan Dueck and compared to Armin Wiebe and Arnold Dyck by scholar Robert Zacharias.

Personal 

The son of a Mennonite minister father and book-keeper mother, Unger was born in Winnipeg in 1979 and lived in Steinbach, Brandon and Calgary as a child before returning to Steinbach as an adult. From his father's side, he is a direct descendant of Kleine Gemeinde founder Klaas Reimer, while his maternal grandfather fled to Canada from the Soviet Union as a refugee in the 1920s. 

As a child he turned to satire, drawing political cartoons, particularly of Canadian Prime Minister Brian Mulroney. Unger attended Providence University College in the late 1990s and holds degrees from the University of Manitoba. He has taught English Language Arts, including satire and creative writing, at Steinbach Regional Secondary School since 2005.

Unger is married to Erin Koop Unger, author of Mennotoba.

In 2021, during the COVID-19 pandemic, Unger successfully advocated for the Manitoba government to create vaccine stickers in the Russian Mennonite dialect of Plautdietsch.

References

External links
 
 Daily Bonnet site

1979 births
Canadian humorists
Canadian male novelists
Canadian Mennonites
Canadian satirists
Living people
Mennonite writers
Mennonite humorists
Writers from Winnipeg
Writers from Calgary
Writers from Steinbach, Manitoba
Writers from Brandon, Manitoba
University of Manitoba alumni
21st-century Canadian novelists